Yé is a department or commune of Nayala Province in western Burkina Faso. Its capital is the town of Yé. According to the 2019 census the department has a total population of 49,926.

Towns and villages

 Yé	(5 903 inhabitants) (capital)
 Bondaogtenga	(766 inhabitants)
 Bouna	(1 212 inhabitants)
 Daman	(3 541 inhabitants)
 Doumbassa	(1 077 inhabitants)
 Goersa	(1 471 inhabitants)
 Kangotenga	(903 inhabitants)
 Kobé	(160 inhabitants)
 Mélou	(2 971 inhabitants)
 Mobgowindtenga	(1 430 inhabitants)
 Nabonswindé	(1 780 inhabitants)
 Niempourou	(1 901 inhabitants)
 Noagtenga	(565 inhabitants)
 Sankoué	(2 993 inhabitants)
 Saoura	(2 056 inhabitants)
 Sidikitenga	(638 inhabitants)
 Siguinvoussé	(862 inhabitants)
 Tani	(2 567 inhabitants)
 Watinoma	(1 458 inhabitants)
 Yambatenga	(597 inhabitants)

References

Departments of Burkina Faso
Nayala Province